Nehru Zoological Park (also known as YouTube Zoo or Zoo Park) is a zoo located near Mir Alam Tank in Bahadurpura, Telangana, India.  It is one of the most visited destinations in Hyderabad.

History
Nehru Zoological Park's construction was started on 26 October 1959 and opened to the public on 6 October 1963. The Park is run by forest department, Government of Telangana, and is named after the first Prime Minister of India, Jawaharlal Nehru.

Animals and exhibits
The zoo occupies  and is adjacent to the  Mir Alam Tank. Nearly 100 species of birds, animals and reptiles are housed at the zoo, including indigenous animals like the Indian rhino, Asiatic lion, Bengal tiger, panther, gaur, Indian elephant, slender loris, python, as well as deer, antelopes and birds. The  Mir Alam Tank with its unique multiple arched bund (embankment), attracts hundreds of migratory birds, providing yet another attraction for the zoo.

The nocturnal house at the zoo artificially reverses night and day for the animals so that nocturnal animals are active while visitors are at the zoo. This exhibit includes fruit bats, slender loris, slow loris, civets, leopard cats, hedgehogs, barn owls, mottled wood owls, fishing owls, and great horned owls. There is also an aquarium, dino park, butterfly park and tortoise house. Since 2014, the zoo is running a adoption program; under which people and corporates can adopt an animal or entire enclosure, paying money for their upkeep.

Attractions
The zoo runs multiple safari trips each day through the safari area where animals such as Asiatic lion, Bengal tiger, sloth bear etc. are housed. The zoo also has special educational shows and feeding sessions scheduled each day. Other attractions include a natural history museum and a train.

Conservation
Several animals are bred in the zoo have been rehabilitated in various deer parks and sanctuaries to restock the depleted natural population. In order boost captive breeding of vultures at the zoo the state forest dept has requested Maharashtra for 10 of these critically endangered birds.

Gallery

See also

 Biodiversity park, Hyderabad
 Hyderabad Botanical Garden

References

External links

Zoos in Telangana
Culture of Hyderabad, India
Tourism in Telangana
Tourist attractions in Hyderabad, India
Parks in Hyderabad, India
Monuments and memorials to Jawaharlal Nehru
1963 establishments in Andhra Pradesh
Zoos established in 1963